KMPB (90.7 FM, is a radio station broadcasting a public radio news, talk and music format. Licensed to Breckenridge, Colorado, United States, the station is currently owned by Community Radio for Northern Colorado.

History
The station was assigned the call letters KRKM on April 2, 2008. Its call sign changed to KMPB on February 1, 2010.

References

External links
KMPB website
 
 

MPB
Radio stations established in 2008